Moldova competed at the 2000 Summer Paralympics in Sydney, Australia. 6 competitors from Moldova won no medals to finish joint 69th in the medal table along with all other countries who failed to win medals.

See also 
 Moldova at the Paralympics
 Moldova at the 2000 Summer Olympics

References 

Moldova at the Paralympics
2000 in Moldovan sport
Nations at the 2000 Summer Paralympics